General Dalton may refer to:

Albert Clayton Dalton (1867–1957), U.S. Army brigadier general
Emmet Dalton (1898–1978), British Army major general
James E. Dalton (born 1930), U.S. Air Force general